Moataz Ali Mohamed Ben Amer (born 1981) is a Libyan former footballer who played for his hometown club Al Ahly Benghazi and for the Libyan national team.

References

External links
 
 

Libyan footballers
Living people
1981 births
2012 Africa Cup of Nations players
Association football defenders
Libya international footballers
Al-Ahly SC (Benghazi) players
CS Hammam-Lif players
Libyan expatriate footballers
Expatriate footballers in Tunisia